Coleophora albiradiata is a moth of the family Coleophoridae. It is found in southern Queensland and from coastal New South Wales to central Australia and on Java.

The larvae have been reared on Rutidosis helychrysoides.

References

External links

Moths of Australia
albiradiata
Moths described in 1973
Moths of Indonesia